Cube is a 1997 Canadian independent science fiction horror film directed and co-written by Vincenzo Natali. A product of the Canadian Film Centre's First Feature Project, Nicole de Boer, Nicky Guadagni, David Hewlett, Andrew Miller, Julian Richings, Wayne Robson, and Maurice Dean Wint star as individuals trapped in a bizarre and deadly labyrinth of cube-shaped rooms.

Cube gained notoriety and a cult following, for its surreal and Kafkaesque setting in industrial, cube-shaped rooms. It received generally positive reviews and led to a series of films. An American remake, currently on hold, is in development at Lionsgate, and a Japanese remake was released in 2021.

Plot

A man named Alderson awakens in a mysterious cube-shaped room. He enters another red-colored room, but a thin wire mesh slices him into cubes, gorily killing him before retracting to its original position.

Five different people (Quentin, Holloway, Worth, Leaven and Rennes) all meet in the same room, unaware how they got here or why they are here. Quentin, a divorced police officer who was exploring, warns the group about trapped rooms. Leaven, a young mathematics student, notices metal plates with three sets of numbers etched into them. Rennes, an escape artist who has fled seven prisons, tests his theory that each trap could be set by motion detectors by throwing his boot into a room. This initially works, but after jumping into a room, he is killed by acid. The group, horrified, realizes each trap is set by different sensors.

Quentin believes each person was chosen specifically to be there. Leaven hypothesizes that rooms whose plates contain prime numbers are trapped. While exploring, they encounter a mentally disabled man named Kazan. Holloway, a free clinic doctor, insists they bring him along, greatly upsetting Quentin. After Quentin injures his leg in a trapped room Leaven deemed safe, tension rises among the group, as well as the mystery of the maze's purpose. The nihilistic Worth admits to Quentin he helped construct the cube, designing its outer shell, and claims it was for a shady bureaucracy of some kind. He guesses that the original purpose has just been forgotten, and they have only been placed inside to put it to use.

Worth's knowledge of the outer shell's dimensions allows Leaven to calculate that with 26 rooms in each row, the entire Cube has 17,576 rooms overall (however later the reveal of a 'bridge' room would mean 17,577 total rooms). She realizes that the numbers may indicate each room's Cartesian coordinates. Following the theory, the group travels to the outer edge but realize every room there is trapped. Rather than backtrack, they traverse a room with a sound-activated trap. After Kazan nearly causes Quentin's death, Holloway defends him from Quentin's threats, insinuating that Quentin may be an abusive husband who likes young girls.

The group reaches the edge, finding a bottomless abyss separating the Cube from the outer shell. Being one of the lightest, Holloway tries to swing over to the outer shell, lowered down using a rope made of the group's uniforms tied together. The Cube shakes, causing everyone to accidentally release the rope, and Quentin catches it at the last second. He initially pulls her up but then lets her fall to her death.

Quentin, becoming more unhinged, persuades Leaven to abandon Kazan and Worth. He tries to sexually assault her, but Worth attacks him. Quentin counters savagely, dropping him into the room below. Worth starts laughing hysterically, realizing they are in the same room Rennes died, indicating they have been traveling in circles. Quentin is horrified, but Worth finds the room where Rennes died in has now moved to the edge of the maze. Leaven deduces that traps are not tagged by prime numbers, but by powers of prime numbers. Kazan is revealed as an autistic savant who can mentally calculate prime factorizations. With this newfound knowledge, Leaven guides the group to the edge cube, using Kazan's calculations. Worth then traps Quentin in the door, letting Leaven and Kazan escape from him. When Quentin finds them, he attempts to harm them, before Worth opens the hatch under him from the room below. The others travel to the bridge room where they open the exit hatch, seeing a bright light.

As Leaven attempts to persuade the guilt-stricken Worth, who no longer wishes to escape, Quentin reappears and fatally impales her with a hatch lever. Worth angrily attacks Quentin. Quentin mortally wounds him and pursues Kazan to the other side. Worth grabs Quentin's legs, pinning him in between the hatch. The cubes move, splitting him in half. Worth, bleeding out, crawls to Leaven's corpse to die next to her. Kazan wanders out into the bright light, his fate left unknown.

Cast 
The cast is of Canadian actors who were relatively unknown in the United States at the time of the film's release. Each character's name is connected with a real-world prison.

On casting Maurice Dean Wint as Quentin, Natali's cost-centric approach sought an actor for a split-personality role of hero and villain. Wint was considered the standout among the cast and was confident that the film would be a breakthrough for the Canadian Film Centre.

Development

Pre-production
An episode of the original Twilight Zone television series, "Five Characters in Search of an Exit" (first aired 22 December 1961), was reportedly an inspiration for the film. Other inspiration was Alfred Hitchcock's Lifeboat, which was shot entirely in a lifeboat with no actor standing at any point.

Director Vincenzo Natali did not have confidence in financing a film. He cost-reduced his pitch with a single set reused as many, with the actors moving around a virtual maze. As the most expensive element, a set with a cube and a half was built off the floor, to allow the surroundings to be lit from behind all walls of the cube. In 1990, Natali had had the idea to make a film "set entirely in hell", but in 1994 while working as a storyboard artist's assistant at Canada's Nelvana animation studio, he completed the first script for Cube. The initial draft had a more comedic tone, surreal images, a cannibal, edible moss growing on the walls, and a monster that roamed the Cube. Roommate and childhood filmmaking partner Andre Bijelic helped Natali strip the central idea to its essence of people avoiding deadly traps in a maze. Scenes outside the cube were deleted, and the identity of the victims changed. In some drafts, they were accountants and in others criminals, with the implication that their banishment to the Cube was part of a penal sentence. One of the most important dramatic changes was the removal of food and water for a more urgent escape.

After writing Cube, Natali developed the short film, Elevated. It is set in an elevator to show investors how Cube would hypothetically look and feel. Cinematographer Derek Rogers developed strategies for shooting in the tightly confined elevator, which he later reused on a Toronto soundstage for Cube.

Casting started with Natali's friends, and budget limitations allowed for only one day of script reading prior to shooting. As it was filmed relatively quickly with well prepared actors, there are no known outtake clips.

Filming
The film was shot in Toronto, Ontario in 21 days, with 50% of the budget as C$350,000 to C$375,000 in cash and the other 50% as donated services, for a total of C$700,000. Natali considered the cash figure to be deceptive, because they deferred payment on goods and services, and got the special effects at no cost.

The set's warehouse was near a train line, and its noise was incorporated into the film as that of the cubes moving. To change the look of each room, some scenes were shot with wide lens, and others are long lens and lit with different colors, for the illusion of traversing a maze. Nicole de Boer said that the white room was more comforting to actors at the start of a day's filming, compared to the red room which induced psychological effects on the cast during several hours in the confined space.

The Cube was conceived by mathematician David W. Pravica, who was the math consultant. It consists of an outer cubical shell or sarcophagus, and the inner cube rooms. Each room is labelled with three identification numbers such as "517 478 565". These numbers encode the starting coordinates of the room, and the X, Y, and Z coordinates are the sums of the digits of the first, second, and third number, respectively. The numbers also determine the movement of the room. The subsequent positions are obtained by cyclically subtracting the digits from one another, and the resulting numbers are then successively added to the starting numbers.

The colour of the room was changed by sliding panels. This time-consuming procedure determined that the film was not shot in sequence, and all shots taking place in rooms of a specific color were shot separately. Six colors of rooms were intended to match the recurring theme of six throughout the film; five sets of gel panels, plus pure white. However, the budget did not stretch to the sixth gel panel, and so the film has only five room colors. Another partial cube was made for shots requiring the point of view of standing in one room and looking into another.

The small set created technical problems for hosting a 30-person crew and a 6-person cast, becoming "a weird fusion between sci-fi and the guerrilla-style approach to filmmaking".

Post-production
During post-production, Natali spent months "on the aural environment", including appropriate sound effects of each room, so the Cube feels like a haunted house.

Release
Cube was shown at the Toronto International Film Festival on 9 September 1997 and released in Ottawa and Montreal on 18 September 1998. A theatrical release occurred in Spain in early 1999, while in Italy a release was scheduled for July 1999 and an opening in Germany was set for later that year. In the Japanese market, it became the top video rental at the time, and exceeded expectations, with co-writer Graeme Manson suggesting people in Japan had a better understanding of living in boxes so resonated better with the Japanese audience, as they were likely "more receptive to the whole metaphor underlying the film".

The film's television debut in the United States was on 24 July 1999 on the Sci-Fi channel.

Reception

Box office
In its home country of Canada, the film was a commercial failure, lasting only a few days in Canadian theatres. French film distributor Samuel Hadida's company Metropolitan Filmexport saw potential in the film and spent $1.2 million in a marketing campaign, posting flyers in many cities and flying members of the cast over to France to meet moviegoers. At its peak, the film was shown at 220 French box offices and became among the most popular films in France of that time, collecting over $10 million in box office receipts. It went on to be the second-highest-grossing film in France that summer.

Elsewhere internationally, the film grossed $501,818 in the United States, and $8,479,845 in other territories, for a worldwide total of $8,981,663.

Critical response
On review aggregator Rotten Tomatoes, Cube holds an approval rating of 64%, based on 39 reviews, and an average rating of 6.3/10. The website's consensus reads: "Cube sometimes struggles with where to take its intriguing premise, but gripping pace and an impressive intelligence make it hard to turn away". On Metacritic, the film has a score 61 out of 100, based on 12 critics, indicating "generally favorable reviews".

Bob Graham of the San Francisco Chronicle was highly critical: "If writer-director Vincenzo Natali, storyboard artist for Keanu Reeves's Johnny Mnemonic, were as comfortable with dialogue and dramatizing characters as he is with images, this first feature of his might have worked better". Nick Schager from Slant Magazine rated the film three out of five stars, noting that, its intriguing premise and initially chilling mood were undone by threadbare characterizations, and lack of a satisfying explanation for the cube's existence. He concluded the film "winds up going nowhere fast".

Anita Gates of The New York Times was more positive, saying the story "proves surprisingly gripping, in the best Twilight Zone tradition. The ensemble cast does an outstanding job on the cinematic equivalent of a bare stage... Everyone has his or her own theory about who is behind this peculiar imprisonment... The weakness in Cube is the dialogue, which sometimes turns remarkably trite... The strength is the film's understated but real tension. Vincenzo Natali, the film's fledgling director and co-writer, has delivered an allegory, too, about futility, about the necessity and certain betrayal of trust, about human beings who do not for a second have the luxury of doing nothing". Bloody Disgusting gave a positive review: "Shoddy acting and a semi-weak script can't hold this movie back. It's simply too good a premise and too well-directed to let minor hindrances derail its creepy premise". Kim Newman from Empire Online gave the film 4/5 stars, writing: "Too many low-budget sci-fi films try for epic scope and fail; this one concentrates on making the best of what it's got and does it well".

Accolades

The film won the award for Best Canadian First Feature Film at the 1997 Toronto International Film Festival and the Jury Award at the Brussels International Festival of Fantasy Film.

Series and remakes

After Cube achieved cult status, it was followed by a sequel, Cube 2: Hypercube, released in 2002, and a prequel, Cube Zero, released in 2004.

In April 2015, The Hollywood Reporter wrote that Lionsgate Films was planning to remake the film, titled Cubed, with Saman Kesh directing, Roy Lee and Jon Spaihts producing, and a screenplay by Philip Gawthorne, based on Kesh’s original take.

A Japanese remake, also called Cube, was released in October 2021.

See also

 "The Library of Babel"
 Saw (2004 film)

References

External links

 
 
 
 
 

1997 directorial debut films
1997 films
1997 horror films
1997 independent films
1990s Canadian films
1990s English-language films
1990s Japanese films
1990s psychological horror films
1990s science fiction horror films
Canadian Film Centre films
Canadian horror thriller films
Canadian independent films
Canadian psychological horror films
Canadian science fiction horror films
Cube (film series)
English-language Canadian films
Fictional cubes
Films about autism
Films about mathematics
Films directed by Vincenzo Natali
Films scored by Mark Korven
Films shot in Toronto
Films with screenplays by Vincenzo Natali
Social science fiction films
Trimark Pictures films